The West Michigan Longest Yard Sale is an annual event in Lake and Newaygo counties in Michigan. The four-day event usually takes place during the last weekend of June. The event stretches along M-37 starting in the Bailey–Grant area of Newaygo County through Lake County. Sales include antiques, crafts, treasures and various food vendors. Sellers include several hundred homeowners, area businesses, and professional dealers and vendors. The event is sponsored by the Newaygo County Convention & Visitors Bureau and the Lake County Chamber of Commerce.

External links
 West Michigan Longest Yard Sale

Tourist attractions in Newaygo County, Michigan
Festivals in Michigan
Tourist attractions in Lake County, Michigan